was a Japanese video game and software developer founded in October 1983 by Kazuyuki Fukushima. The company had several video game divisions including: Wolf Team, Laser Soft, Reno, Renovation Products, Riot, Commseed, and Telenet Jr. Telenet Japan's North American subsidiary, Renovation Products, was acquired by Sega of America in 1993. Sunsoft acquired Telenet's entire software library in December 2009, citing plans to remake or re-release (via Virtual Console) the old titles. The Japanese company Edia acquired Telenet's catalogue from City Connection in January 2020.

Riot
The Riot division came into existence in 1991 when Telenet Japan was expanding in the country.

However, because Telenet was starting to lose sales in 1993, the company went through extensive restructuring which resulted in the closing of a few subsidiaries. Some staff employed at Laser Soft and Riot were transferred to another subsidiary, Wolfteam. The same year, several key developers of the PC Engine games Tenshi no Uta I & II left Riot to found Media.Vision and work on a new RPG franchise, Wild Arms.

Riot was also known for employing graphic artist and later game director Eiji Kikuchi, as well as music composer Michiko Naruke.

Games list

Developed
 Mega Drive/Genesis
 Beast Wrestler
 XZR II: Kanketsuhen
 Gaiares
 Syd of Valis
 Traysia
 Valis: The Fantasm Soldier
 Valis III
 MSX
 Andorogynus
 XZR: Hakai no Gūzō
 XZR II: Kanketsuhen
 Sa-Zi-Ri
 Valis: The Fantasm Soldier
 Valis: The Fantasm Soldier II
 Digital Devil Story: Megami Tensei
 Nintendo 64
 Parlor Pro Pachinko
 GameCube
 Swingerz Golf (released as Ace Golf in Europe and Wai Wai Golf in Japan)
 PlayStation 2
 Eagle Eye Golf (released as Enjoy Golf! in Japan)
 Mahjong Party: Idol to Mahjong Shoubu
 PC
 Meccha Golf
 Super Famicom/Super NES
 Ace o Nerae!
 Dark Kingdom
 Edo no Kiba
 Psycho Dream
 Super Valis IV
 Sharp X1/X1 Turbo
 Digital Devil Story: Megami Tensei
 NEC PC-88/PC-8800 series
 Digital Devil Story: Megami Tensei
 PC Engine/TurboGrafx-16/TurboGrafx
 Avenger
 Babel
 Browning
 Columns (video game)
 Cosmic Fantasy
 Cosmic Fantasy 2
 Cosmic Fantasy Visual Collection
 Cosmic Fantasy III
 Cosmic Fantasy IV-Chapter 1
 Cosmic Fantasy IV-Chapter 2
 Death Bringer
 Dekoboko Densetsu Hashiru Wagamanma
 Exile
 Exile: Wicked Phenomenon
 Final Zone II
 F1 Team Simulation Project F
 Golden Axe
 High Grenadier
 Jantei Monogatari
 Kiaiden 00
 Lady Phantom
 Last Alert
 Legion
 Maho Shoujo Silky Lip
 Master of Monsters
 Meikyu no Elfeene
 Mirai Shounen Conan
 Valis: The Fantasm Soldier
 Valis II
 Valis III
 Valis IV
 Valis Visual Collection
 Police Connection
 Pop 'n Magic
 Psychic Storm
 Puzzle Boy
 Sugoroku '92 Nari Tore Nariagari Trendy
 Super Albatross
 Tenshi no Uta
 Tenshi no Uta II: Datenshi no Sentaku
 Travel Apple
 Xak I & II

Published

 Game Boy
 Pachinko CR: Daiku no Gen-San GB
 Game Gear
 Zan Gear
 Mega Drive/Genesis
 Gaiares
 Syd of Valis
 The Tennis Tournament: Grandslam
 Traysia
 Valis III
 Valis: The Fantasm Soldier
 Zan: Yasha Enbukyoku
 Arcus Odyssey
 El Viento
 Elemental Master
 Gain Ground
 Earnest Evans
 Whip Rush
 Arrow Flash
 Dino Land
 Exile
 Beast Wrestler
 Master of Monsters
 Sol-Deace
 Valis: The Fantasm Soldier
 Ys III: Wanderers from Ys
 Granada
 Final Zone
 Mega-CD
 Cyborg 009
 Sol-Feace
 Cobra Command
 Time Gal
 Road Avenger
 Cosmic Fantasy Stories
 Earnest Evans
 MSX
 Sa-Zi-Ri
 Valis II
 Albatross Tournament Golf
 American Truck
 Digital Devil Story: Megami Tensei
 Nintendo 64
 Parlor Pro Pachinko
 Sharp X1/X1 Turbo
 Digital Devil Story: Megami Tensei
 NEC PC-88/PC-8800 series
 Digital Devil Story: Megami Tensei
 PC
 Albatross
 Albatross 2: Master's History
 Valis X (published by Eants, a hentai developer)
 Zan
 Zan II
 Zan III
 PlayStation
 Cybernetic Empire
 PlayStation 2
 Enjoy Golf!
 Mahjong Party: Idol to Mahjong Shoubu
 Super Famicom/Super NES
 Dark Kingdom
 Doomsday Warrior
 The Journey Home
 Super Valis IV
 Zan II Spirits
 Zan III Spirits
 Psycho Dream
 PC Engine/TurboGrafx-16/TurboGrafx
 Andre Panza Kick Boxing
 Avenger
 Babel
 Browning
 Columns
 Cosmic Fantasy
 Cosmic Fantasy II
 Cosmic Fantasy Visual Collection
 Cosmic Fantasy III
 Cosmic Fantasy IV-Chapter 1
 Cosmic Fantasy IV-Chapter 2
 Death Bringer
 Dekoboko Densetsu Hashiru Wagamanma
 Exile
 Exile: Wicked Phenomenon
 Final Zone II
 F1 Team Simulation Project F
 Golden Axe
 High Grenadier
 Jantei Monogatari
 Kiaiden 00
 Lady Phantom
 Last Alert
 Legion
 Maho Shoujo Silky Lip
 Meikyu no Elfeene
 Mirai Shounen Conan
 Super Albatross
 Valis: The Fantasm Soldier
 Valis II
 Valis III
 Valis IV
 Valis Visual Collection
 Police Connection
 Pop 'n Magic
 Psychic Storm
 Puzzle Boy
 Sugoroku '92 Nari Tore Nariagari Trendy
 Super Albatross
 Tenshi no Uta
 Tenshi no Uta II: Datenshi no Sentaku
 Travel Apple
 Xak I & II
 Sharp X68000
 Death Bringer
 Sol-Feace

References

External links

Giant Bomb Profile
MobyGames Profile

Defunct video game companies of Japan
Video game companies established in 1983
Video game companies disestablished in 2007
Video game development companies